Fear and Loathing in Las Vegas is a 1971 novel by Hunter S. Thompson.

Fear and Loathing in Las Vegas may also refer to:

Fear and Loathing in Las Vegas (film), a 1998 film based on the novel
Fear, and Loathing in Las Vegas, a Japanese metalcore band